The French National Committee (CNF) was the coordinating body created by General Charles de Gaulle which acted as the government in exile of Free France from 1941 to 1943.  The committee was the successor of the smaller Empire Defense Council.

It was Winston Churchill who suggested that de Gaulle create a committee, in order to lend an appearance of more constitutionally based and less dictatorial authority. According to historian , De Gaulle went on to accept his proposal, but took care to exclude all his adversaries within the Free France movement, such as Émile Muselier, André Labarthe and others, retaining only "yes men" in the group.

The CNF was founded 24 September 1941 by an edict signed by General de Gaulle in London. The committee remained active until 3 June 1943, when it merged with the French Civil and Military High Command headed by Henri Giraud, becoming the new French Committee of National Liberation.

Composition 

The French National Committee comprised six civilian and six military personnel:

 Brigadier General Charles de Gaulle, President;
 René Pleven, Commissioner of Economy, Finance and the Colonies. In charge of the coordination of civilian administrative departments ;
 Major General Paul Legentilhomme, Commissioner of War;
 , Commissioner of Foreign Affairs until October 18, 1942 (dismissal), interim replacement by Pleven and then by René Massigli;
 René Cassin, Commissioner of Justice and Public Instruction;
 André Diethelm, Commissioner for Action in the Metropolis, Work, and Information;
 André Philip, Commissioner of the Interior from 27;
 Jacques Soustelle, Commissioner of Information from July 27, 1942;
 Air Brigade General Martial Valin, Commissioner of the Air Force;
 Vice-Admiral Émile Muselier, Commissioner of the Navy and the Merchant Navy, until March 3, 1942 (resignation); replaced by Rear Admiral Philippe Auboyneau from 4;
 Lieutenant General Georges Catroux, commissioner at large from March 4, 1942;
 Rear Admiral Georges Thierry d'Argenlieu, commissioner at large from March 4, 1942.

On 20 March 1943, the committee secretly appointed Jean Moulin, then in London, as representative of the French National Committee in Metropolitan France and "national commissioner on active duty" and put him in charge of creating a single coordinating body for the French Resistance. According to Daniel Cordier, "Jean Moulin was then becoming one of the main characters of the French internal Resistance.

See also 

 Brazzaville Conference
 Allies of World War II
 Collaboration with the Axis Powers during World War II
 Foreign policy of Charles de Gaulle
 Foreign relations of Vichy France
 Free French Africa
 French Resistance
 French Colonial Empire
 French Fourth Republic
 French Third Republic
 Liberation of France
 Liberation of Paris
 List of French possessions and colonies
 List of Governors-General of French Equatorial Africa
 Military history of France during World War II
 Philippe Pétain
 Provisional Government of the French Republic
 Vichy France
 Vichy French Air Force
 Zone libre

References 
Notes

Citations

Works cited

External links 
 Free France Foundation

 

 

1941 in France
1942 in France
1943 in France
French people of World War II
French Resistance
World War II political leaders